The Temple of Dusk is a lost 1918 American silent drama film directed by James Young. It was produced by Sessue Hayakawa's Haworth Pictures Corporation.

Plot
As described in a film magazine, Akira (Hayakawa), a Japanese poet who lives in Tokyo, falls in love with an American, Ruth Vale (Novak), who has grown to womanhood under his father's care. He is much saddened, however, when she marries an American. Three years elapse and Ruth dies of an illness, leaving a baby in the poet's care. Akira agrees to accompany the child and father to America, and when the American is accused of the murder of a man who entered his home, Akira assumes the guilt. He escapes from prison to visit the child and is shot by a guard. An allegorical scene shows Akira and Ruth entering the Temple of Dusk together.

Cast
Sessue Hayakawa as Akira
Jane Novak as Ruth Vale
Louis Willoughby as Edward Markham
Mary Jane Irving as Blossom
Sylvia Breamer as Adrienne Chester
Henry A. Barrows as Pembroke Wilson (credited as Henry Barrows)

Reception
Like many American films of the time, The Temple of Dusk was subject to cuts by city and state film censorship boards. For example, the Chicago Board of Censors required a cut, in Reel 3, of the scene with the wife at the mantle and her lover on the couch and the first kissing scene between wife and lover where Akira discovers them.

References

External links 

Haworth Pictures Corporation films
1918 drama films
1918 films
Silent American drama films
American black-and-white films
American silent feature films
Lost American films
Films with screenplays by Frances Marion
1918 lost films
Lost drama films
1910s American films
1910s English-language films